Kara Grainger is an Australian soul blues and roots rock singer-songwriter, based out of Nashville, Tennessee, United States. She played with the Papa Lips band starting in 1994. In 1998, they were awarded the "Best New Band" award at the Australian Blues Music Awards. They changed their name to Grainger in 1998 and continued to play together until 2001. She signed as a solo artist with Craving Records in 2006.

Early life 
Grainger was always singing, and started learning how to play the guitar at age 12, improvising by her mid-teens. Grainger taught herself to play while listening to musicians such as Etta James, John Lee Hooker, Stevie Ray Vaughan, and Little Feat. She grew up in Balmain, a suburb of Sydney, Australia, known for its pubs and live music venues that caters to jazz and blues music. She played in several bands during secondary school, and was encouraged by a teacher to perform live, and she took guitar lessons from a local instructor, Mark Williams who had connections to professional musicians, which lead to regular opportunities to play at one of Sydney's premiere music venues, The Basement.

Career

Bands: Papa Lips and Grainger 
In 1994, when Grainger was 16 and just out of Balmain High School, she formed the band Papa Lips with her brother Mitch Grainger who had recently left his previous band, the Bondi Cigars. Papa Lips was a Blues & Roots band fronted by the Graingers, but also included Declan Kelly on drums, Rowan Lane on bass, Danny Guerrero on percussion, and Clayton Doley on keyboards. John Brewster managed the band along with Mitch.

Papa Lips recorded and released one EP in 1996, Harmony, and one album in 1998, High Time Now, both distributed by Festival Records. They toured extensively on Australia's east coast, and played major Australian music festivals such as the Byron Bay Blues & Roots Festival, the East Coast Blues and Roots Festival and Woodford Folk Festival. In 1998 Papa Lips were awarded, "Best New Band" at the Australian Blues Music Awards.

In 1998 the band was introduced to the producer Harry Vanda of The Easybeats and AC/DC fame and signed by Albert Productions. The band changed their name to Grainger and were in the studio for a period of two years recording an EP, "Sky Is Falling", and an unreleased album. In September 2001 Kara Grainger traveled along with her brother Mitch to New York to meet with American record labels, Atlantic Records, Sony BMG, Virgin Records and Elektra Records. The pair arrived in Manhattan on 9 September and were witness to the 11 September attacks. This brought on a period of reflection and the band was soon to be disbanded with Kara and her brother Mitch deciding to take separate musical paths.

Solo career 
After separating from the band Grainger, Kara Grainger played briefly with the Steve Prestwich Band in 2005. In 2006, Grainger signed as a solo artist with the Australian label Craving Records, releasing her solo EP Secret Soul in 2006. The label encouraged her to go to the United States to record her first solo album, and in 2008 she moved to Los Angeles, and released her debut solo album, Grand and Green River. The album charted on the top 40 Americana charts for 38 straight weeks, and won first prize for a Roots album in 2008 from the Indie Acoustic Project (IAP). Grainger was invited to perform at the Folk Alliance International in 2006, 2007, and 2008 in Austin, Texas, and Memphis, Tennessee.

In 2011, Grainger released her second album, L.A. Blues. The album was mostly a cover album, with only two original tracks, while the covers paid tribute to the early blues musicians who influenced her. Grainger toured throughout the US, Europe, Australia, and Asia, and has opened for several well-known artists, such as Buddy Guy, Marc Cohn, Peter Frampton, Robert Plant, Heart, Taj Mahal, and Jonny Lang.

Shiver & Sigh was recorded and released in 2013. Members of Bonnie Raitt's touring band, James Hutchinson and Mike Finnigan, supported Grainger in the recording of the album. Grainger's brother, harmonica player Mitch Grainger supports her on her cover of Robert Johnson's "C'mon in My Kitchen". Graham Clarke, of Blues Bytes states that the album is "a smooth, sensuous, slow burner of a release, as Kara Grainger shows that you can be as effective with a whisper as with a scream. This is a marvelous set of soulful blues that really hits home."

On 1 June 2018, Grainger released Living with Your Ghost, on Station House Records.

Personal life 
Grainger currently lives in the US in Nashville, Tennessee. When she first moved to L.A., California, she did not anticipate staying beyond a year, but she found herself playing with some musicians she knew from albums. After living there for six months, she decided to make the move permanent. The American musicians were pushing themselves to improve and take it up a level, while she felt that many of the Australian musicians were laid-back. Grainger moved to Texas for a while, where she got to play with Eric Johnson. Grainger moved back to Los Angeles for a period of time, where she eventually found herself at home with the community. In her own words, "It took me a while to settle there but at the same time, it has the most amazing facilities, the best recording studios, no end of great musicians."

Discography

Papa Lips album

High Time Now

Kara Grainger solo albums

Grand and Green River

L.A. Blues



Living with Your Ghost

EPs

Harmony (Papa Lips)

Sky Is Falling (Grainger)

Secret Soul (Kara Grainger)

References

External links 
Official website

Living people
Blues rock musicians
Slide guitarists
21st-century Australian singers
Australian women singer-songwriters
Year of birth missing (living people)
21st-century Australian women singers